Marc Levy (born 16 October 1961) is a French novelist.

Career 
Levy was born in Boulogne-Billancourt, Hauts-de-Seine, and studied management and computers at Paris Dauphine University.

In the late 1990s, Levy wrote a story that his sister, then a screenwriter, encouraged him to send to Editions Robert Laffont, who immediately decided to publish If Only It Were True. Before it was published, Steven Spielberg (DreamWorks) acquired film rights to the novel. The movie, Just like Heaven, produced by Steven Spielberg, and starring Reese Witherspoon and Mark Ruffalo, was a #1 box office hit in America in 2005.

After If Only It Were True, Marc Levy began writing full-time.

Levy was first married at the age of 26; he had a son, the inspiration for If Only It Were True. He is married and lives in New York City.

Bibliography 
 If Only It Were True, 2000 (adapted for film in 2005)
 Finding You, 2001 (adapted for television in 2007)
 Seven Days for an Eternity, 2003
 In Another Life, 2004
 Vous revoir, 2005 (the sequel to If Only It Were True) 
 London Mon Amour, 2006 (adapted for film in 2008)
 Children of Freedom, 2007
 All Those Things We Never Said, 2008.
 The First Day, 2009
 The First Night, 2009 (the sequel to The First Day)
 The Shadow Thief, 2010
 The Strange Journey of Mr. Daldry, 2011
 Replay, 2012
 Stronger than Fear, 2013
 Another Idea of Happiness, 2014
 P.S. from Paris, AmazonCrossing, 2015, trans. Sam Taylor
 The Last of the Stanfields, AmazonCrossing, 2019, trans. Daniel Wasserman
 A Woman Like Her, AmazonCrossing, 2020, trans. Kate Deimling
 Hope, AmazonCrossing, 2021, trans. Hannah Dickens-Doyle

Filmography
 La tortue sur le dos (1978) - Gus, le voyageur
 L'amour dure trois ans (2011) - Himself

Short film
 La Lettre de Nabila directed for Amnesty International, adapted from a short story he co-wrote with Sophie Fontanel.

References

External links 
 Site officiel
 The story behind Replay – Online Essay by Marc Levy at Upcoming4.me

1961 births
Living people
People from Boulogne-Billancourt
21st-century French novelists
Paris Dauphine University alumni
French male novelists
French psychological fiction writers
21st-century French male writers